E! is the defunct Singaporean version of the American TV channel E! which owned the American TV channel of the same name in Hollywood, Los Angeles as Singaporean 24-hour English entertainment pay television channel was officially full formal launched on 3 May 1995 as a 24-hour pay television channel. It is owned by NBCUniversal International Networks under Television Corporation of Singapore (TCS). This channel officially slogan, motto, jargon and tagline is Be Pop Cultured.

History

Opening ceremony
E! Entertainment Television and Hallmark Channel Asia (now Diva) was officially launched on 3 May 1995 as Singaporean 24-hour English high-definition entertainment pay television channel under Television Corporation of Singapore (TCS) along with MTV broadcast from Singapore seen throughout Southeast Asia in territories including Malaysia and Singapore.

E! Entertainment Television and Hallmark Channel Asia (now Diva) official launching ceremony or grand launching based in Singapore on Wednesday, 3 May 1995 at 00:00:00am SST with official opening ceremony by Tyra Banks along with Hallmark Channel Asia (now Diva) and MTV Southeast Asia officially sign marked international version of the American TV channel E! Entertainment which owned the American TV channel of the same name in Hollywood, Los Angeles. At the that time, E! Entertainment Television and Hallmark Channel Asia (now Diva) was officially opening ceremony or grand opening celebrate on air from icon locations; the Padang, Singapore and Changi Airport for E! Entertainment Television and Hallmark Channel Asia (now Diva).

At the same time, E! Entertainment Television and Hallmark Channel Asia (now Diva) was launched on the Singapore Version. E! Entertainment Television and Hallmark Channel Asia (now Diva) officially opening ceremony its production facilities fully in Singapore. Popular reality shows included Oprah Winfrey's The Oprah Winfrey Show and Kim Kardashian, Khloé Kardashian and Kourtney Kardashian's Keeping Up with the Kardashians.

On 14 March 2019, E! Entertainment on Astro Channel 712 officially shift and switch to HD format and the HD version of E! Entertainment HD officially opening on 16 October 2019.

Closing Night
As part of a restructuring at NBCUniversal International Networks and as preparation of formal full grand launched of Hayu in Asia was officially opening ceremony on New Year's Day (1 January) 2020 at midnight stroke, E! Entertainment Television and Diva officially ceased broadcast and transmission after very final and last programme and very final and last American reality television show with very final and last episode of Keeping Up with the Kardashians officially the end with the season 17 overall episode 252 episode 12 with "Cattle Drive Me Crazy" chapter, station ident/logo of E! Entertainment Be Pop Cultured and finally national anthem was played with Singapore English/Singlish translated because due very final and last time say farewell was broadcast the end all operations on very final and last night of 2010s and 2019 marked New Year's Eve 2019 (Farewell 2010s and 2019) at 11:59:59pm after officially closing ceremony by Kourtney Kardashian, Kim Kardashian, Kylie Jenner, Kendall Jenner and Khloé Kardashian was officially closing ceremony or grand closing celebrate off air from icon locations at Marina Bay Sands, Marina Bay, Downtown Core, Singapore. The very final and last were:
Very final and last television programme: Keeping Up with the Kardashians officially the end with the season 17 overall episode 252 episode 12 with "Cattle Drive Me Crazy" chapter
Very final and last American reality television show: Keeping Up with the Kardashians officially the end with the season 17 overall episode 252 episode 12 with "Cattle Drive Me Crazy" chapter
Very final and last television station ident/logo: E! Entertainment Be Pop Cultured
Very final and last television music videos: National anthem was played with Singapore English/Singlish translated
Official closing ceremony of E! Entertainment Asia was officially screen cuts to black slow version two minutes as closing scenes on television switch off to screen cuts to ceased broadcast and ceased transmission on final last the end farewell on-screen message card words "THIS CHANNEL HAS BEEN CEASED BROADCAST. PLEASE CONTACT YOUR SERVICE PROVIDER FOR DETAILS" officially ceased broadcast so all E! Entertainment Asia shows shift and move to officially be replaced by CNBC Asia to all E! shows shift and moved to be officially replaced by return restore handover to E! Hollywood - Los Angeles on very first and begin start day of 2020s and 2020 marked New Year's Day 2020 (Hello Welcome New Decade/2020s and 2020) at midnight stroke.

Former original programming
In December 2014, the channel launched its first local Malaysian miniseries Facing Up to Fazura. E! Asia also produced E! News Asia Specials, focusing profiles of national celebrities such as Aaron Aziz, Anne Curtis, Jay Park, and Lisa Surihani.

Final programming

Keeping Up with the Kardashians
Revenge Body with Khloé Kardashian

References

Television channels and stations established in 1995
Television channels and stations disestablished in 2019
Infotainment
English-language television stations
Television in Singapore
Broadcasting in Singapore
Mass media in Singapore
Mass media in Southeast Asia
1995 establishments in Singapore
2019 disestablishments in Singapore
Television stations in Singapore
Defunct television channels